The Dyckman-Hillside Substation, also known as Substation 17, is a historic electrical substation located at 127-129 Hillside Avenue between Sickles Street and Nagle Avenue, near the Dyckman Street station of the New York City Subway's IRT Broadway–Seventh Avenue Line, in Inwood, Manhattan, New York City. It was one of eight substations constructed by the Interborough Rapid Transit Company in 1904–05.

The substation is a two-story, freestanding masonry building in the Beaux-Arts style.  It features a hipped roof, tower-like projections, scrolled wrought iron brackets, and terra cotta decorative details.

It was listed on the National Register of Historic Places in 2006.

References
Notes

External links

Buildings and structures on the National Register of Historic Places in Manhattan
Industrial buildings and structures on the National Register of Historic Places in New York City
Beaux-Arts architecture in New York City
Energy infrastructure completed in 1905
Industrial buildings and structures in Manhattan
Inwood, Manhattan
New York City Subway infrastructure
1905 establishments in New York City